Orders, decorations and medals of Abkhazia is a system of awards of the Republic of Abkhazia, formed by the Decree of the Supreme Council of the Republic of Abkhazia on December 4, 1992.

The awards of Abkhazia can be awarded to both citizens of Abkhazia and foreign citizens.

Highest Title

Orders

Medals

Gallery

See also
Orders, decorations and medals of South Ossetia

References 

A